Masato Watanabe (渡辺 正人, born April 3, 1979 in Osaka) is a Japanese professional baseball infielder for the Chiba Lotte Marines in Japan's Nippon Professional Baseball.

External links

NPB

1979 births
Chiba Lotte Marines players
Japanese baseball players
Living people
Baseball people from Osaka